Zacharzyn  (germ. Zachasberg) is a village in the administrative district of Gmina Chodzież, within Chodzież County, Greater Poland Voivodeship, in west-central Poland.

The village has a population of 704.

References

Zacharzyn